The San Raffaele University of Rome, often simply abbreviated as "UniSanRaffaele" is a private online university founded in 2006 in Rome, Italy. It should not be confused with Vita-Salute San Raffaele University, specialised in Life Sciences.

Method of study
Provides e-learning courses, centers remote throughout the Italy.

Rector
 Enrico Garaci

See also 
 List of Italian universities
 Rome
 Distance education

References

External links 
 San Raffaele University of Rome University Website (Homepage) (in Italian)

Universities and colleges in Rome
Private universities and colleges in Italy
Educational institutions established in 2006
Rome
Distance education institutions based in Italy